Francesco Pratali (born 17 January 1979) is a retired Italian footballer who played  as a defender.

During the 2009–10 season, ultras of Torino F.C. attacked the club's players during David Di Michele's birthday party. After the incident the players involved: Di Michele, Massimo Loviso, Riccardo Colombo, Aimo Diana, Marco Pisano, Pratali, Paolo Zanetti were transferred to other clubs; only Rolando Bianchi, Matteo Rubin and Angelo Ogbonna remained.

References

External links
Profile at Soccerway

1979 births
Living people
Sportspeople from the Province of Pisa
Association football defenders
Italian footballers
Serie A players
Serie B players
Empoli F.C. players
Torino F.C. players
A.C.N. Siena 1904 players
A.S.D. Jolly Montemurlo players
A.C. Tuttocuoio 1957 San_Miniato players
Footballers from Tuscany